Sir Thomas Morgan (c. 1589 – 13 May 1664 or 18 October 1666) was a Welsh politician who sat in the House of Commons in 1654.

Biography
Morgan was the eldest son of  Sir William Morgan. He was admitted to Inner Temple in 1650.

In 1654, Morgan was elected Member of Parliament for Monmouthshire in the First Protectorate Parliament after two members chose to take up other seats.
 
Morgan died on either 13 May 1664 or 18 October 1666.

Family
Morgan married  firstly  Rachel Kemys, widow of David Kemys and daughter of Sir Robert Hopton. She was sister to Ralph Lord Hopton. He married secondly Elizabeth Windham, daughter of Francis or Thomas Windham of Sandhills Somerset.

Notes

References

1580s births
1664 deaths
English MPs 1654–1655
Year of birth uncertain
Members of the Inner Temple
Place of birth missing
People from Monmouthshire
People from Machen
Year of death uncertain